Asparagus nesiotes is a species of flowering plant in the family Asparagaceae, native to the Canary Islands and the Savage Islands.

Asparagus nesiotes is a source of feed for small ruminants.

References

nesiotes
Flora of the Canary Islands
Flora of the Savage Islands
Plants described in 1969